The 24th season of Arthur began airing on PBS Kids in the United States on March 8, 2021.

Episodes

Production 
Oasis Animation produced the 24th season of Arthur.

References

2021 American television seasons
2021 Canadian television seasons
Arthur (TV series) seasons